Tip the Van is an American rock/ska group formed in Marlborough, Connecticut, United States, in 2002. The lineup consists of Nicole Oliva (vocals), Simone Oliva (vocals), Stephanie Allen (trombone/keyboard), Brian Dunnigan (lead guitar), and Bryan Howard (bass). After nine years, three EP's, one album, and several national tours, the band announced its indefinite hiatus in 2011. In 2019, the band reunited for two live performances in Connecticut.

Band history
Tip The Van was formed in 2002 by sisters Nicole and Simone Oliva while in high school. The band began as a ska band featuring a large horn section. In 2004, trombonist, Stephanie Allen, joined the lineup and was featured on the band's first EP, Circles. Shortly after the release of the EP, the original lineup dissolved and for a time, various members of other local bands would step in on a temporary basis to perform live with the band.

In 2005, Tip The Van was invited to join the Vans Warped Tour as a part of the ShiraGirl Stage and played alongside Paramore, Damone, ShiraGirl and other female-fronted bands. After releasing their first full-length studio album, Something Wicked, Tip The Van was asked to join the Warped Tour once again. Supporting their 2009 release, Passion, Love & Pride, Tip the Van joined the 2010 Warped Tour on the Kevin Says Stage.

In 2009, the band toured the U.S. with Reel Big Fish and Streetlight Manifesto, releasing their third EP, Passion, Love & Pride. Later that year, Nicole and Simone were invited to join up with Boston's Big D and the Kids Table as two of the original Doped Up Dollies, recording on Big D's full length Fluent In Stroll (2009), and touring with Big D on the Vans Warped Tour.

Tip the Van joined the 2010 Warped Tour on the Kevin Says Stage, and released a single, Refuse The Tide (2010). They also recorded a cover of The Postal Service song, Such Great Heights, and Nicole, Simone, and Steph performed on a recording of She Has A Girlfriend Now with Reel Big Fish, which was released as a Ska Is Dead 7" split in 2011.

In April 2011, Tip The Van announced that the band was officially on an indefinite hiatus, citing the desire to pursue individual projects and endeavors as motivation.

In June 2019, the band announced they would begin re-releasing their discography digitally for purchase across streaming platforms. On November 30, the band reunited to perform an opening set for Spring Heeled Jack at Toad's Place in New Haven, Connecticut. While rehearsing for this performance, the reunited band decided to book a headlining reunion show for December 21 at Space Ballroom in Hamden, Connecticut.

Membership
Current members
Nicole Oliva - Vocals
Simone Oliva - Vocals/Guitar
Stephanie Allen - Trombone/Synthesizer
Brian Dunnigan - Guitar
Bryan Howard - Bass guitar
Bryan Briggs - (Drums 2008-2010)

Notable previous members
Justin Kripps - Bass (2003–2007)
Anthony Del Vecchio - Trumpet (2004–2007)
Matthew Levesque - Drums (2005–2007)
Jamie Rogers - Guitar (2002–2004)
Peter Mueller - Tenor Sax (2002–2004)

Discography
Circles (2004)
Manners Matter (2005)
Something Wicked (2006)
Passion, Love & Pride (2009)
Refuse the Tide (2019)

References

External links

 

American ska punk musical groups
Third-wave ska groups
Reggae rock groups
Musical groups established in 2002
Rock music groups from Connecticut
2002 establishments in Connecticut
American ska musical groups